Košice railway station (also known for a short period as Košice hlavná stanica) serves the city of Košice, seat of the Košice Region, eastern Slovakia.

Opened in 1860, the station is the eastern terminus of the Košice–Žilina railway, which forms part of Slovakia's main east–west rail corridor. It is also the terminus of a number of other lines, some of them linking Slovakia with other countries.

The station is currently owned by Železnice Slovenskej republiky (ŽSR); train services are operated by Železničná spoločnosť Slovensko (ZSSK), RegioJet (RJ) and LEO Express (LE) (since 14 December 2014).

Location
It is near the western bank of the river Hornád, in the borough of Staré Mesto, which forms part of the Košice I district.

History
The station was opened on 14 August 1860, upon the inauguration of the Miskolc–Košice railway, which linked Košice with Miskolc in present-day Hungary.

The current station building has been in place since 1973, and is a modified version of an earlier building constructed in 1871.

Lines
Košice railway station is a hub for the following Slovakian railway lines:

160 Zvolen–Košice
169 Košice−Hidasnémeti (MÁV START)
180 Košice–Žilina
188 (Košice)–Kysak–Prešov–Muszyna (PKP)
190 Košice–Čierna nad Tisou–Chop (Ukrsalisnyzja)

Lines 180 and 190 combine to form part of Pan-European Corridor Va, which runs from Venice in Italy to Kyiv in Ukraine, via Bratislava, Žilina, Košice and Uzhhorod.

Interchange
The station offers interchange with Košice trams and local buses managed by the Dopravný podnik mesta Košice (DPMK), or Košice Transit Company. Košice's long-distance bus station is nearby.

Services

See also

History of rail transport in Slovakia
Public transport in Košice
Rail transport in Slovakia

References

External links

 Košice railway station on vlaky.net 

Railway Station
R
Railway stations in Košice Region
Railway stations opened in 1860
Ferenc Pfaff railway stations
Railway stations in Slovakia opened in the 19th century